Cuprammonium rayon is a rayon fiber made from cellulose dissolved in a cuprammonium solution, Schweizer's reagent.

It is produced by making cellulose a soluble compound by combining it with copper and ammonia with caustic soda. The solution is passed through a spinneret and the cellulose is regenerated in hardening baths that remove the copper and ammonia and neutralize the caustic soda. Cuprammonium rayon is usually made in fine filaments that are used in lightweight summer dresses and blouses, sometimes in combination with cotton to make textured fabrics with slubbed, uneven surfaces.

The fabric is commonly known by the trade name "Bemberg", owned by the J.P. Bemberg company. The fabric may also be known as "cupro" or "cupra". It is also known as "ammonia silk" on Chinese fashion retail websites.

History
Cuprammonium rayon was invented in 1890. 

Swiss chemist Matthias Eduard Schweizer (1818–1860) discovered that cellulose dissolves in tetraaminecopper dihydroxide. Max Fremery and Johann Urban developed a method to produce carbon fibers for use in light bulbs in 1897 (the factory closed in 1902). Production of cuprammonium rayon for textiles started in 1899 in the Vereinigte Glanzstoff Fabriken AG in Oberbruch near Aachen. An improvement by J. P. Bemberg AG in 1904 made the artificial silk a product comparable to real silk.

Properties
 The fibers are very fine
 It has a soft, silk-like handle (i.e., tactile feel)
 It has similar properties to cotton. It is different in that the average degree of polymerization is lower and a larger part of this fiber is occupied by amorphous regions, causing cuprammonium rayon to swell
 It burns rapidly and chars at 180°C
 On ignition, it leaves behind ash containing copper
 It can be used to create fabric that is sheer and lightweight and has desirable draping properties

Production
Cellulose is dissolved in a [Cu(NH3)4](OH)2 solution and then regenerates as rayon when extruded into sulfuric acid.

References

Synthetic fibers
Cellulose